Hauger Fotballklubb was an association football club from Bærum, Norway.

It was founded on 14 October 1969, and plays at Rudbanen, which got astroturf in 2004. Hauger played in the Third Division in the seasons 2005, 2006, 2007 and 2010.

In 2014 Hauger FK joined Bærums Verk Idrettsforening and established a new sports club, Bærums Verk og Hauger Idrettsforening.

References

External links
Official site

Football clubs in Norway
Sport in Bærum
Association football clubs established in 1969
1969 establishments in Norway